FMJ may refer to:

 Full metal jacket bullet, a bullet consisting of a soft core encased in a shell of harder metal
 Full Metal Jacket, a 1987 war film produced, directed and co-written by Stanley Kubrick
 Full Metal Jousting, an American reality television show that debuted on the History Channel
 Funhit Mein Jaari, a Hindi-language television comedy series